Michal Shalev (Hebrew: מיכל שלו) is an Israeli author and illustrator of children's books. She has an MA in children's book illustration from the Cambridge School of Art. She is also a graduate of WIZO Haifa Academy of Design and Education.

Select English bibliography
2016: How to be Famous, 32pp.,

References

Israeli writers
Living people
Alumni of Anglia Ruskin University
Year of birth missing (living people)

he:מיכל שלו